A monoid is an algebraic structure.

Monoid may also refer to:
Monoid (category theory), a mathematical structure used in category theory